"The Pilot" is the two-part season finale episode of season four of Seinfeld, comprising the season's 23rd and 24th episodes (63rd and 64th episodes in the series). It first aired on May 20, 1993 on NBC.

This two-part episode aired at an earlier time, 8:00 p.m., to leave room for the two-hour series finale of Cheers, whose timeslot was subsequently claimed by Seinfeld at the start of the 1993-94 season in September 1993.  

About 32 million people watched both parts of "The Pilot" when it initially aired. An additional 2 million watched the first part but not the second, and 3 million more watched the second part but not the first.

Plot

Part 1
Jerry and George get the green light to produce Jerry, the pilot for the series based on their "nothing" lives. Russell Dalrymple, the president at NBC behind the pilot, is obsessed with Elaine. George is obsessed with a potentially cancerous white spot on his lip and a box of raisins taken by Tom Pepper, the actor playing Kramer.

The real Kramer appears to audition for the role of Kramer but has an urgent need to use the men’s room. Unable to use various public facilities, he makes his way to his apartment through Central Park but is further delayed by being mugged and "misses his chance", resulting in constipation. Jerry has an audition with Sandi Robbins, a method actress interested in being Elaine in every way, including insisting being called Elaine and even dating Jerry (and breaking up with him in Part 2). Jerry points out to the real Elaine that Monk's coffee shop appears to be only hiring buxom waitresses, so she tries to get hired, and when the owner turns her down, she files a report with the Equal Employment Opportunity office.

Part 2
Rehearsals for the pilot begin. NBC executive Russell Dalrymple's obsession with Elaine begins to affect his work. She tries to let him down gently by saying she can't be in a relationship with a high-powered man and would prefer to be with someone selfless, such as a member of Greenpeace. Kramer resolves his constipation by administering himself an enema.

George thinks that his white spot has been diagnosed as cancer and freaks out at NBC, only to discover that he misunderstood the diagnosis. At the taping of the pilot, "Crazy" Joe Davola leaps out of the audience and onto the set while yelling "Sic semper tyrannis!" The director and actors also become increasingly annoyed by George's kibitzing, and Jerry discovers that he is not as good at acting as he is at standup.

The pilot airs and numerous characters from past episodes of the season comment on it. Although Jerry and friends are pleased by the quality of the pilot, mere moments after it airs Rita Kearson phones to inform them Russell has absconded and she has taken over as NBC's President, immediately canceling Jerry. George and Jerry blame Elaine for causing Russell to leave.

Jerry, George, Kramer, and Elaine convene at Monk's, where Elaine spots the men from the Equal Employment Opportunity office eating. When she scolds the owner of the cafe for only hiring large breasted women, he explains that they are all his daughters.

In order to prove himself worthy of Elaine, Russell joins Greenpeace and is lost at sea during a botched assault on a whaling ship. As the cover for the Jerry pilot script floats away along with the former NBC president, one of Russell's shipmates vows to find Elaine and tell her about Russell's actions in fighting the whalers.

Production
The character of Russell Dalrimple, played by Bob Balaban, is based on NBC executive Warren Littlefield. In 1996, Balaban was cast as Littlefield in the HBO movie, The Late Shift.

Numerous guest stars from previous episodes of Seinfeld made cameos in the pilot, specifically Brian Doyle-Murray as Mel Sanger, Tony Amendola as Salman Rushdie, Teri Hatcher as Sidra Holland, Jon Hayman as Donald Sanger, Nicholas Hormann as Calvin Klein, Jennifer Campbell as Tia Van Camp, Bill Erwin as Sid Fields, Wayne Knight as Newman, Jane Leeves as Marla Penny, Barney Martin as Morty Seinfeld, Liz Sheridan as Helen Seinfeld, Rick Overton as The Drake, Elizabeth Dennehy as The Drakette, Heidi Swedberg as Susan Ross, and Ping Wu as Ping.

References

External links
 

Seinfeld (season 4) episodes
1993 American television episodes
Seinfeld episodes in multiple parts
Television episodes written by Larry David